Christ Episcopal Church is a historic Episcopal church complex located near Cleveland, Rowan County, North Carolina, USA. The complex includes the 1826-1827 gable-front vernacular Gothic Revival- and American Craftsman-style brick veneered, heavy timber frame chapel; a 1926 Craftsman-style parish house attached to the original building by an open brick arcaded breezeway; and a historic cemetery.

It was added to the National Register of Historic Places in 2011.

References

External links
Official website

Episcopal church buildings in North Carolina
Churches on the National Register of Historic Places in North Carolina
Gothic Revival architecture in North Carolina
Churches completed in 1827
19th-century Episcopal church buildings
Churches in Rowan County, North Carolina
Cemeteries in North Carolina
National Register of Historic Places in Rowan County, North Carolina